Usofila is a genus of American long-legged cave spiders that was first described by Eugen von Keyserling in 1891. Originally placed with the Ochyroceratidae, it was transferred to the Telemidae in 1973.

Species
 it contains four species, found in the United States:
Usofila flava Chamberlin & Ivie, 1942 – USA
Usofila gracilis Keyserling, 1891 (type) – USA
Usofila oregona Chamberlin & Ivie, 1942 – USA
Usofila pacifica (Banks, 1894) – USA
Formerly included
Usofila pecki Brignoli, 1980 = Telemofila pecki

See also
 List of Telemidae species
Telema

References

Araneomorphae genera
Spiders of the United States
Taxa named by Eugen von Keyserling
Telemidae